Razag Khoosaf may refer to:
 Razg, Khusf
 Rehizg